Madhavdev (1489–1596) (Pron: ˈʃrɪ ˈʃrɪ ˈmɑ:dəbˌdeɪv) is an important preceptor of the Ekasarana Dharma known for his loyalty to his guru, Srimanta Sankardev as well as his artistic brilliance.  Initially a sakta worshipper, he was converted to Ekasarana Dharma by Sankardev and became his most prominent disciple.  He became the religious as well as artistic successor of Sankardeva after the latter's death in 1568.  He is known particularly for his book of hymns, the Naam Ghosa, as well as a large selection of songs called Borgeets.

Biography

Early life in adversity
Madhavdev was born in May 1489 at Baligrama in Lakhimpur District of Assam to Govindagiri Bhuyan and Manorama. Govindagiri was a descendant of Hari Bhuyan one of the Bhuyan's who accompanied Candivara (Sankardev's forefather) in the 14th century as part of an exchange between Dharmanarayana of Gauda and Durlabhnarayan of Kamarupa-Kamata. Govindagiri became a Majinder at Banduka, (in Rangpur District, in present-day Bangladesh) and established his family (wife and a son) there. On the death of his wife, he migrated to Bardowa Nagaon District, present-day Assam, and married Manorama of the Baro-Bhuyan clan. But due to warfare between the Bara Bhuyans and the Kacharis he became homeless and Harasinga Bora, an officer of the Sutiya kingdom, gave him shelter at Letekupukhuri where Madhavdev was born. Harisinga Bora arranged for Madhavdev's early education at Narayanpur.

A famine induced the family to move again, and the family was given shelter by a boatman named Ghagari Maji at Habung, a place near Dhakuakhana in Lakhimpur district. Here Madhabdev's sister Urvasi was born. After about 10 years at Habung, the family rowed down the Brahmaputra river to Rauta-Tembuwani (present-day Bordowa), where Urvasi was married off to Gayapani, a Bhuyan. Soon after, Madhabdev accompanied his father back to Banduka (leaving behind his mother with his sister and brother-in-law), where he continued his education under a teacher named Rajendra Adhyapak. Here, Madhabdev became well versed in the Tantras, Tarka-shastra, Purana and other literature associated with Saktism. Soon after, his father Govindagiri died.

Leaving his half-brother (named either Damodara or Rupchandra), Madhavdev returned to his brother-in-law Gayapani with the news and stayed on involving himself with trade in betel-leaf and areca nut. When his half-brother, who was a Majinder at Banduka, fell ill Madhabdev returned there to shoulder his responsibilities. At Banduka he received news of his mother's failing health and he hastened back to Dhuwahat, where Gayapani had moved to along with his wife and mother-in-law after the Kacharis had uprooted the Bara Bhuyans.

Meeting with Sankardev
Madhavdev had grown into a staunch sakta in his learning and practice, and on receiving news of his mother's illness while in Banduka, he resolved to sacrifice two goats to propitiate the goddess.  In the meantime his brother-in-law Gayapani had converted to Ekasarana and refused to procure the goats for the sacrifice.  A debate ensued and Gayapani, now named Ramadasa, took Madhabdev to meet Sankardev to discuss the conflicts.  The debate continued for four and a half hour, when Sankardev uttered a sloka from the Bhagavata Purana.  Madhabdev was convinced and he accepted Sankardev as his guru.  At the age of thirty-two, he joined his scholarship, literary and musical genius to the cause of Ekasarana dharma.  Sankardev accepted him as his prana bandhava (friend of the soul), and anointed him later as his successor. Madhabdev's conversion occurred in the year 1532.

After his conversion, Madhabdev broke his betrothal and resolved never to marry.

The Saint passed in 1596 at Madhupur Satra, Koch Bihar.

Literary works
As an author and saint-poet, Madhavdev's contribution to his Guru's religion is immense. He is the author of the holy Naam Ghosa, (the book of the Lord's Name), which is as great a work as Sankardev's Kirtan ghosa. This work is also known as the Hazari ghosa (the book of thousand couplets). The English version of this book subtitled as The Divine Verses translated by Soroj Kumar Dutta in 1997 in lucid verse.  His another significant work is the Bhakti Ratnavali.  He is also the author of many Borgeets (noble numbers) (191 of them) besides nine Jhumuras (one-act plays). His first literary work is Janma Rahasya, based on the creation and destruction of the world. Among his other outstanding contributions are Naam Maalikaa and the Assamese rendering of the Adi Kanda of Valmiki's Ramayana. His Guru Bhattima the long poem of praise to his Guru, Srimanta Sankardev is also very popular. He also composed a third chapter on having lost the two chapters composed by Sankardev, of the Kirtan-Ghosha titled Dhyana VarnanaDrama : Arjun Bhanjan, Chordhara, Pimpara Guchowa, Bhumi Letowa, Bhojan Bihar. Except Arjun Bhanjan, his other dramas are called Jumuras.Songs' : Borgeet, Bhotima.

Notes

References

External links 

 The Telegraph news paper - contains a news item about developing a cultural complex at Madhabdev's birthplace.
 Govt. of India CIC Narayanpur Home Page - contains some information about Madhabdev's birthplace.
 Sri Sri Madhav Dev – a great saint — Dr Dibakar Ch Das, The Assam Tribune, 9 September 2009.
 Mahapurush Sri Sri Madhavdev at Vedanti.com
 Life Sketch of Sri Sri Madhavdev at barpetasatra.com.
 মহাপুৰুষ শ্ৰীশ্ৰীমাধৱদেৱৰ জীৱন পৰিক্ৰমাঃ লেটেকুপুখুৰীৰ পৰা ভেলা মধুপুৰলৈ at satirtha.in.

People from Lakhimpur district
1489 births
1596 deaths
Ekasarana Dharma
Assamese-language poets
Poets from Assam
Assam dramatists and playwrights
16th-century Indian dramatists and playwrights
Dramatists and playwrights from Assam